Aafke van Leeuwen (born 13 July 1992) is a martial arts fighter. She represents the Netherlands in ju-jitsu at international competitions.

Van Leeuwen became world champion for the fourth time in 2022. She competed at the 2022 World Games, winning the bronze medal in the mixed team event.

References

1992 births
Living people
Dutch female martial artists